Heinrich or Heinz Andergassen (30 July 1908 in Hall, Tyrol, Austro-Hungarian Empire – 26 July 1946 in Livorno, Italy) was an engineer, SS officer, and convicted war criminal who was executed for the torture and murder of seven Allied prisoners of war. He was a SS-Sturmscharführer and later an SS-Untersturmführer in Northern Italy.

Origin 
Heinrichs parents were Hall goldsmith and later police officer August Andergassen and Maria. Grandparents Franz Alexander Andergassen so called Princely Enzenberg Courts Cabinetmaker at Tratzberg Castle and Salva Guardia with Anna originated in Kaltern an der Weinstrasse/Caldaro sulla Strada del Vino Italy and Schwaz in Tirol Austria. Andergassen has not been married and presumably not a father. He has been living in Italy, Innsbruck, Hall and Volders close Gauleiter Hofer so called Lachhof estate. Cousin’s wife or maid Maria Andergassen has been victimized and died at Hartheim Castle by T4 in follow. The cousin himself Franz Josef Andergassen son of Ignaz has converted in 1934, Mar. with their child to Lutheran Church Confessio Augustana. Heinrich Andergassen’s uncle Josef Domenikus Andergassen has been the cabinetmaker and decorative arts contributor at some local important church interiors in the Habsburg Monarchy, Austria and abroad most of Gothic Revival Style. An assumed life-size portrait sitting of Maria Andergassen drawn by her cousin Josef Andergassen occasionally theater architect of Hippach in Zillertal Valley son of Josef Domenikus resisted wartime ruins as a private heritage. His brother, Anton Johann Andergassen, had been better educated as denturist partly in Munich. Most of his professional life he has been working in Brixlegg though he was not able to survive mental health hospitalization postwar and died of Tuberculosis never silent across Europe in letters arguing Human Rights. In WWII he has joined Wehrmacht as gunner towards France until 1941 but he sabotaged or self-harmed himself by a hand shot, later he has resisted in table a petition to save Brixlegg Innriver bridge at General SS being shot therefore and last but not least in written statement to Berlin concerning his 1938 Parteimitgliedschaft. This lungs bullet forced him to hide in a Tyrolese traditional farmhouse oven outside Kitzbühel Lebenberg Castle until he got found by family members and been brought to a hospital before he has been transferred to French liberation camp Woergl for clarification as follower in 1945. During wartime at Brixlegg butcher’s shop have been information resistance activities he joined. Anton has been mentioned as best friend of Heinrich in family context and Toni has been somehow a father of three Heinrich b.1946, Gerda b.1941, Michael b.1947 with different female partners, but never met or has not been permitted to get known to any of his children.

Career
Andergassen was educated as a machinist at Swarowski in Wattens. In 1929 he voluntarily joined the Army and has been trained at Viennese Arsenal. In 1937 he was appointed Gendarm. After Anschluss he got NSDAP member, and became active with Gestapo. At German occupation of Czechoslovakian Sudetenland in October 1938 he served in a 100-strong police unit. Then he started career as a Gestapo officer in Innsbruck. Andergassen was later sent to Italy, where he served as an SD officer in Merano. On the night of 15 September 1946, he led raids which resulted in the arrests of 25 Jews living in Merano. The Jews were locked in a basement and deported the next morning. They were taken by truck to Reichenau concentration camp in Austria. The 25 Jews stayed there for about six months, during which four of them died. At the beginning of March 1944, the rest were deported to Auschwitz concentration camp. Only one of the Jews abducted, Valeska von Hoffmann, survived the Holocaust.

Manlio Longon 
On 15 December 1944, the SS captured Manlio Longon Comitato di Liberazione Nazionale leader of the Italian Resistance Alto Adige. On order of August Schiffer, Longon was tortured and hanged by Andergassen and Storz at Army Corps Bolzano on Jan. 1, 1945.

Roderick Stephen Hall 
On 26 January 1945 the OSS Captain Roderick Stephen Hall, who had been active in occupied Italy for some months was captured by the SS in Cortina d’Ampezzo and forced to Gestapo Bolzano/Bozen. On 19 February 1945 Roderick Stephen Hall was tortured and killed by Andergassen and SS-Oberscharführer Albert Storz on orders of SS-Sturmbannführer August Schiffer.

Arrest, trial, and execution 
On 30 April 1945 Andergassen, together with Schiffer and Storz as a driver, fled from the approaching American armed forces in a black Mercedes to Brennero. May 8 he was captured by the 206th Counterintelligence Corp outside Innsbruck Schiffer, Storz and him were accused as war criminals. Also charged was Gestapo officer Hans Butz. During their trial, held by the U.S. military in Naples, Andergassen made voluntarily declaration that homicide of Roderick Hall was approved by highest Nazi authorities. On 16 January 1946, Andergassen, Schiffer, and Storz were sentenced to death by hanging for the torture and killings of Roderick Stephen Hall, four other American and two British soldiers. Butz received a life sentence due to his more limited involvement and his lack of participation in any other murders. On 26 July 1946, Andergassen, Schiffer, and Storz were all hanged at a military stockade in Livorno.

Postwar reception 
Province of Bolzano/Provinz Bozen Criminal Investigation Department Commissioner Arthur Schuster charged the war criminal with being "the incarnation of sadism and brutality; he was incredibly blood-thirsty, especially when under the influence of strong drink, for which he had a great fondness, and was encouraged in all his excesses by his superior", this being August Schiffer. Nowadays research shows that Nazis preferred Pervitin (a methamphetamine preparation, nicknamed Stuka tablets, Hermann Göring pills) rather than alcohol.

References

Sources 
 CIA. 2010 Featured Story Archive. Roderick Stephen Hall: The Saboteur of Brenner Pass. Oct. 27, 2019
 CIA. Historical Review Program. Release in Full Sept. 22, 1993. Roderick "Steve" Hall. Oct. 27, 2019
Quibble, Anthony. Fall 1967: 4-41-1: Roderick "Steve" Hall (An Alpine Tragedy During the Last Convulsions of World War II). Fall 1967: 4-41-1. Oct. 28, 2019
 United States Holocaust Memorial Museum, courtesy of National Archives and Records Administration, College Park. Photo Defendant Heinrich Andergassen confers with the interpreter for the defense during his trial as an accused war criminal. Oct. 27, 2019
German Federal Archive. Berlin. Heinrich Andergassen. Documents
Lingen, Kerstin von: Conspiracy of Silence: How the „Old Boys“ of American Intelligence Shielded SS General Karl Wolff from Prosecution. In: Holocaust and Genocide Studies. Vol. 22.1. 2008. p. 74- 109.. Oct. 27, 2019
New York Times: Confess Killing Fliers: Germans on Trial in Naples for Murder of Americans. 1946, Jan. 11. p. 2
The Washington Post: Tell of Four U.S. Fliers ́ Death. 1946, Jan. 11. p. 9
Chicago Daily Tribune: 3 Nazis to hang for Murder of 7 Allied Troops. 1946, Jan. 16. p. 12
New York Times: 3 Gestapo Men to Hang: Naples Court Gives Verdict in Murder of 7 Allied Soldiers. 1946, Jan. 16. p. 7
New York Times: Germans incensed at U.S.-Danes Pact: Germans charged with killing Allied Men in Italy. 1946, Feb. 3. p. 12
Los Angeles Times: S.S. Torture Trio Hanged. 1946, July 27. p. 5
New York Times: 3 S.S. Officers Hanged: Trio Convicted of Torture-Killing of 7 Allied Soldiers in Italy. 1946, July 27. p. 5
DerStandard. Wissenschaft. Welt. Der Hofer war's. 10.09.2002.11:54. Oct. 29, 2019

Further reading 
 O'Donnell, Patrick K.: The Brenner Assignment: The Untold Story of the Most Daring Spy Mission of World War II. Philadelphia: Da Capo, 2008. Oct. 28, 2019
 O'Donnell, Patrick K.: The Dared Return: The True Story of Jewish Spies Behind the Lines in Nazi Germany. Philadelphia: Da Capo, 2009. Oct. 28, 2019
 Steinacher, Gerald: In der Bozner Zelle erhängt …: Roderick Hall — Einziges Ein-Mann-Unternehmen des amerikanischen Kriegsgeheimdienstes in Südtirol" (1999). Oct. 27, 2019
 Steinacher, Gerald: Südtirol und die Geheimdienste 1943-1945, Innsbrucker Forschungen zur Zeitgeschichte, Bd. 15, Innsbruck (u.a.) 2000, pp. 247–251, 255–270.
 Agostini, Piero; Romeo, Carlo [Hrsg.]: Trentino e Alto Adige: province del Reich. Temi, 2002. S. 270
 Beimrohr, Wilfried: Die Gestapo in Tirol und Vorarlberg. In: Tiroler Heimat. Jahrb. f. Gesch. und Volksk., Innsbruck: 2000. S. 225
 Giacomozzi, Carla; Paleari, Giuseppe: Il Lager di Bolzano. Immagini e documenti / NS-Lager Bozen. Bilder und Dokumente. Bozen: 2008-2009. p. 170. Oct. 27, 2019
 Lun, Margareth: NS-Herrschaft in Südtirol. Innsbruck: Studien, 2004. S. 146, 338, 545
 Salter, Michael: Nazi War Crimes, US Intelligence and Selective Prosecution at Nuremberg, p. 111
 Stepanek, Friedrich [Hrsg.]: Carmella Flöck, ...und träumte, ich wäre frei. Eine Tirolerin im Frauenkonzentrationslager... Innsbruck: Tyrolia, 2012. S. 54ff. . Oct. 27, 2019

External links 
 Posthumous Award of Gold Medal for Military Valour an Manlio Longon by Italian President Giuseppe Saragat on 19 July 1971. Oct. 27, 2019
 Award of Honorary Citizenship of the City of Bozen to Manlio Longon in the year 2017.  Oct. 27, 2019
 Gedenkorte Europa 1939-1945. Heinrich Andergassen. Oct. 27, 2019
 National Institute on Drug Abuse. DrugFacts. What is methamphetamine? Revised May 2019. Oct. 29, 2019
 MDR Mitteldeutsches Fernsehen. Kokain des Ostens - Crystal Meth in Mitteldeutschland. Oct. 29, 2019
 AufBauWerk. Unternehmen für junge Menschen. Volders/Lachhof. Oct. 29, 2019
 Stone of Remembrance. Maria Andergassen. Wattens. Tirol. Austria. Nov. 26, 2020
 Memorial. Documentation and Information Centre Hartheim Castle. Alkoven. Oberösterreich. Austria  Dec. 08, 2020
  Bauernhaus mit Backofen. Museum Tiroler Bauernhöfe. Kramsach. Austria Dec. 12, 2020

1908 births
1946 deaths
Gestapo personnel
Germans convicted of war crimes committed in Italy during World War II
SS-Untersturmführer
Holocaust perpetrators in Italy
Executed Austrian Nazis
People executed for war crimes
Nazis executed by the United States military by hanging
Executed mass murderers